The men's discus throw at the 1958 European Athletics Championships was held in Stockholm, Sweden, at Stockholms Olympiastadion on 20 and 22 August 1958.

Medalists

Results

Final
22 August

Qualification
20 August

Participation
According to an unofficial count, 21 athletes from 15 countries participated in the event.

 (1)
 (1)
 (2)
 (2)
 (2)
 (1)
 (1)
 (1)
 (1)
 (2)
 (2)
 (2)
 (1)
 (1)
 (1)

References

Discus throw
Discus throw at the European Athletics Championships